Axelrodia is a genus of small characin from the Amazon Basin and Meta River in South America, with three currently described species:
 Axelrodia lindeae Géry, 1973
 Axelrodia riesei Géry, 1966 (ruby tetra)
 Axelrodia stigmatias (Fowler, 1913)

The genus was named for Herbert R. Axelrod, publisher of Tropical Fish Hobbyist magazine.

References
 

Characidae
Taxa named by Jacques Géry
Fish of South America